Ceroxys morosa is a species of picture-winged fly in the genus Ceroxys of the family Ulidiidae found in
Russia.

References

morosa
Insects described in 1873
Diptera of Europe
Taxa named by Hermann Loew